is a Shinto shrine located in Sakyō-ku in Kyoto, Japan. It was founded in 859 by the Fujiwara clan.

History 

The shrine became the object of Imperial patronage during the early Heian period.  In 965, Emperor Murakami ordered that Imperial messengers were sent to report important events to the guardian kami of Japan. These heihaku were initially presented to 16 shrines; and in 991, Emperor Ichijō added three more shrines to Murakami's list — including Yoshida.

Yoshida Kanetomo, founder of Yoshida Shinto, is buried here.
Beppyo shrines

See also 
 List of Shinto shrines
 Twenty-Two Shrines
 Modern system of ranked Shinto Shrines

Notes

References
 Breen, John and Mark Teeuwen. (2000).  Shinto in History: Ways of the Kami. Honolulu: University of Hawaii Press. 
 Ponsonby-Fane, Richard. (1962).   Studies in Shinto and Shrines. Kyoto: Ponsonby Memorial Society. OCLC 399449
 . (1959).  The Imperial House of Japan. Kyoto: Ponsonby Memorial Society. OCLC 194887

Shinto shrines in Kyoto
Important Cultural Properties of Japan